Laura Napoli is an American actress known for her voice and motion-capture work as Jessie McCarney in the Capcom Xbox 360 hit Dead Rising. She also appeared in Capcom's game Devil May Cry 4 as the motion-capture actress for Kyrie and Lady.

Early life
Napoli graduated from Barnard College in 2001.

Filmography (video games)
Devil May Cry 4 - (motion capture) Lady, Kyrie
Dead Rising - Jessica McCarney/Additional Voices (voiceover and motion capture)

References

External links
 Official Site
 

Year of birth missing (living people)
Living people
American voice actresses
American video game actresses
Barnard College alumni
21st-century American women